Alocasia princeps is a species of flowering plant in the family Araceae, native to Borneo. With its V-shaped leaves it is sometimes kept as a houseplant. There are two cultivars, 'Purple Cloak' and 'Candy Sticks'.

References

princeps
House plants
Endemic flora of Borneo
Plants described in 1888